Akademik Sofia (Bulgarian: “Академик София”) or Academic (in English) is the name of several sports clubs from Sofia, Bulgaria. It may refer to:

PFC Akademik Sofia, an association football club.
PBC Academic, a men's basketball club.
WBC Akademik Sofia, a women's basketball club.
Akademika Sofia, an ice hockey club.
VC Akademik Sofia, a women's volleyball club.